Dark Regions Press is an independent specialty publisher of horror, dark fiction, fantasy and science fiction, specializing in horror and dark fiction in business since 1985 founded by Joe Morey. They have gained recognition around the world for their creative works in genre fiction and poetry.  Dark Regions Press was awarded the Horror Writers Association 2010 Specialty Press Award and the Italian 2012 Black Spot award for Excellence in a Foreign Publisher. They produce premium signed hardcover editions for collectors as well as quality trade paperbacks and ebook editions.  Their books have received seven Bram Stoker Awards from the Horror Writers Association.

DRP has published hundreds of authors, artists and poets such as Clive Barker, Joe R. Lansdale, Santiago Caruso, Ramsey Campbell, Kevin J. Anderson, Vincent Chong, Bentley Little, Michael D. Resnick, Rick Hautala, Bruce Boston, Robert Frazier, W.H. Pugmire, Simon Strantzas, Jeffrey Thomas, Charlee Jacob, Richard Gavin, Tim Waggoner and hundreds more.  Dark Regions Press has been creating specialty books and creative projects for over twenty-nine years.

The press has staff throughout the United States working virtually but also has a localized office in Portland, Oregon from where they ship their orders and maintain the primary components of the business.

Dark Regions Press staff, authors, artists and products have appeared in FANGORIA Magazine, Rue Morgue Magazine, Cemetery Dance Magazine, Dark Discoveries Magazine, Publishers Weekly, Kirkus Reviews, Booklist Online, LA Times, The Sunday Chicago Tribune, The Examiner, Playboy, Comic-Con, Wired, The Huffington Post, Horror World, Barnes & Noble, Amazon, iBooks, Sony Reader store and many other publications and vendors.

List of Authors
Michael A. Arnzen
Allyson Bird
Clive Barker
Robert Borski
Bruce Boston
Ramsey Campbell
Mort Castle
James Chambers
G.O. Clark
Christopher Conlon
Gary William Crawford
James Dorr
David Dunwoody
Gabrielle Faust
Janet Fox
Robert Frazier
Jim Gavin
Richard Gavin
Rick Hautala
Angeline Hawkes
C.J. Henderson
Brian A. Hopkins
Sarah A. Hoyt
Charlee Jacob
Julia Jeffrey
Shaun Jeffrey
Michael Kelly
Caitlín R. Kiernan
Joe R. Lansdale
Mary Soon Lee
Michael McBride
Daniel McGachey
Joe McKinney
Gary McMahon
William Meikle
Paul Melniczek
Wayne Miller
Tom Moran
Gene O'Neill
Scott Nicholson
Weston Ochse
William Ollie
Jeffrey Osier
Tom Piccirilli
W.H. Pugmire
Gina Ranalli
Mike Resnick
Tony Richards
Gord Rollo
Steven Savile
David B. Silva
Harry Shannon
Marge Simon
Dave Smeds
Jeff Strand
Simon Strantzas
Jeffrey Thomas
Scott Thomas
Mary Turzillo
Laura J. Underwood
Steve Vernon
Tim Waggoner
Frank Walls
Jason Whitley
David Niall Wilson

References

Publishing companies of the United States
Companies based in Portland, Oregon
1985 establishments in Oregon